Hydroporus is a genus of water beetles native to the Palearctic (including Europe), the Nearctic, the Near East, and North Africa. It contains the following species:

 Hydroporus acutangulus Thomson, 1856
 Hydroporus americanus Aubé, 1838
 Hydroporus amguemensis Shaverdo, 2003
 Hydroporus ampliatus Zaitzev, 1927
 Hydroporus analis Aubé, 1838
 Hydroporus anatolicus J.Balfour-Browne, 1963
 Hydroporus angusi Nilsson, 1990
 Hydroporus angustatus Sturm, 1835
 Hydroporus apenninus Pederzani & Rocchi, 2005
 Hydroporus appalachius Sherman, 1913
 Hydroporus artvinensis Fery & Köksal, 2009
 Hydroporus askalensis Wewalka, 1992
 Hydroporus aurora Larson & Roughley, 2000
 Hydroporus axillaris LeConte, 1853
 Hydroporus badiellus Fall, 1923
 Hydroporus basinotatus Reiche, 1864
 Hydroporus bergmani Nilsson, 1995
 Hydroporus bodemeyeri Ganglbauer, 1900
 Hydroporus boraeorum Larson & Roughley, 2000
 Hydroporus brancoi Rocchi, 1981
 Hydroporus brancuccii Fery, 1987
 Hydroporus brevicornis Fall, 1917
 Hydroporus brevis R.F.Sahlberg, 1834
 Hydroporus breviusculus Poppius, 1905
 Hydroporus brucki Wehncke, 1875
 Hydroporus cagrankaya Fery & Köksal, 2009
 Hydroporus cantabricus Sharp, 1882
 Hydroporus carli Wewalka, 1992
 Hydroporus carrorum Larson, 1975
 Hydroporus civicus Sharp, 1887
 Hydroporus clessini Lomnicki, 1894
 Hydroporus columbianus Fall, 1923
 Hydroporus compunctus Wollaston, 1865
 Hydroporus constantini Hernando & Fresneda, 1996
 Hydroporus crinitisternus Shaverdo & Fery, 2001
 Hydroporus cuprescens K.W.Miller & Fery, 1995
 Hydroporus decipiens Sharp, 1878
 Hydroporus dentellus Fall, 1917
 Hydroporus despectus Sharp, 1882
 Hydroporus dichrous F.E.Melsheimer, 1844
 Hydroporus discretus Fairmaire & Brisout de Barneville, 1859
 Hydroporus distinguendus Desbrochers des Loges, 1871
 Hydroporus dobrogeanus Ienistea, 1962
 Hydroporus edenianus Lesne, 1926
 Hydroporus elongatulus Sturm, 1835
 Hydroporus errans Sharp, 1882
 Hydroporus erythrocephalus (Linnaeus, 1758)
 Hydroporus erzurumensis Erman & Fery, 2000
 Hydroporus falli Blatchley, 1925
 Hydroporus ferrugineus Stephens, 1829
 Hydroporus feryi Wewalka, 1992
 Hydroporus fortis LeConte, 1852
 Hydroporus foveolatus Heer, 1839
 Hydroporus fuscipennis Schaum, 1868
 Hydroporus geniculatus Thomson, 1856
 Hydroporus georgicus Bilyashiwski, 2004
 Hydroporus glabriusculus Aubé, 1838
 Hydroporus glasunovi Zaitzev, 1905
 Hydroporus goldschmidti Gschwendtner, 1923
 Hydroporus gossei Larson & Roughley, 2000
 Hydroporus gueorguievi Wewalka, 1975
 Hydroporus guernei Régimbart, 1891
 Hydroporus gyllenhalii Schiödte, 1841
 Hydroporus hebaueri Hendrich, 1990
 Hydroporus hellenicus Mazzoldi & Toledo, 1992
 Hydroporus humilis Klug, 1834
 Hydroporus hygrotoides Fery, 2000
 Hydroporus ijimai Nilsson & Nakane, 1993
 Hydroporus inanimatus Scudder, 1900
 Hydroporus incognitus Sharp, 1869
 Hydroporus incommodus Fery, 2006
 Hydroporus ineptus Sharp, 1882
 Hydroporus inscitus Sharp, 1882
 Hydroporus inundatus Scudder, 1900
 Hydroporus jacobsoni Zaitzev, 1927
 Hydroporus jonicus L.Miller, 1862
 Hydroporus jurjurensis Régimbart, 1895
 Hydroporus kabakovi Fery & Petrov, 2006
 Hydroporus kasyi Wewalka, 1984
 Hydroporus klamathensis Larson & Roughley, 2000
 Hydroporus kozlovskii Zaitzev, 1927
 Hydroporus kraatzii Schaum, 1868
 Hydroporus kryshtali Bilyashiwski, 1993
 Hydroporus lapideus Riha, 1974
 Hydroporus lapponum (Gyllenhal, 1808)
 Hydroporus larsoni Nilsson, 1984
 Hydroporus laticollis Zimmermann, 1922
 Hydroporus leechi Gordon, 1981
 Hydroporus lenkoranensis Fery, 1999
 Hydroporus libanus Régimbart, 1901
 Hydroporus limbatus Aubé, 1838
 Hydroporus lluci Fery, 1999
 Hydroporus longicornis Sharp, 1871
 Hydroporus longiusculus Gemminger & Harold, 1868
 Hydroporus longulus Mulsant & Rey, 1861
 Hydroporus lucasi Reiche, 1866
 Hydroporus lundbergi Fery & Köksal, 2009
 Hydroporus lundbladi (Falkenström, 1938)
 Hydroporus macedonicus Fery & Pesic, 2006
 Hydroporus mannerheimi J.Balfour-Browne, 1944
 Hydroporus marginatus (Duftschmid, 1805)
 Hydroporus mariannae Wewalka, 1974
 Hydroporus martensi Brancucci, 1981
 Hydroporus melanarius Sturm, 1835
 Hydroporus melsheimeri Fall, 1917
 Hydroporus memnonius Nicolai, 1822
 Hydroporus morio Aubé, 1838
 Hydroporus multiguttatus Régimbart, 1878
 Hydroporus multipunctatus Statz, 1939
 Hydroporus nanpingensis Toledo & Mazzoldi, 1996
 Hydroporus neclae Erman & Fery, 2006
 Hydroporus necopinatus Fery, 1999
 Hydroporus neglectus Schaum, 1845
 Hydroporus nevadensis Sharp, 1882
 Hydroporus nigellus Mannerheim, 1853
 Hydroporus niger Say, 1823
 Hydroporus nigrita (Fabricius, 1792)
 Hydroporus normandi Régimbart, 1903
 Hydroporus notabilis LeConte, 1850
 Hydroporus notatus Sturm, 1835
 Hydroporus oasis Wewalka, 1992
 Hydroporus obscurus Sturm, 1835
 Hydroporus obsoletus Aubé, 1838
 Hydroporus occidentalis Sharp, 1882
 Hydroporus paganettianus Scholz, 1923
 Hydroporus palustris (Linnaeus, 1761)
 Hydroporus pervicinus Fall, 1923
 Hydroporus petrefactus Weyenbergh, 1869
 Hydroporus pfefferi Wewalka, 1974
 Hydroporus pilosus (Guignot, 1949)
 Hydroporus planus (Fabricius, 1782)
 Hydroporus pleistocenicus Lomnicki, 1894
 Hydroporus polaris Fall, 1923
 Hydroporus praedorsalis Lomnicki, 1894
 Hydroporus praenigrita Lomnicki, 1894
 Hydroporus praenivalis Lomnicki, 1894
 Hydroporus productus Fairmaire, 1880
 Hydroporus pseudoniger Nilsson & Fery, 2006
 Hydroporus pseudopubescens Zimmermann, 1919
 Hydroporus puberulus LeConte, 1850
 Hydroporus pubescens (Gyllenhal, 1808)
 Hydroporus punctipennis J.Sahlberg, 1880
 Hydroporus rectus Fall, 1923
 Hydroporus regularis Sharp, 1882
 Hydroporus rufifrons (O.F.Müller, 1776)
 Hydroporus rufilabris Sharp, 1882
 Hydroporus rufinasus Mannerheim, 1852
 Hydroporus sabaudus Fauvel, 1865
 Hydroporus saghaliensis Takizawa, 1933
 Hydroporus sandbergeri Lomnicki, 1894
 Hydroporus sanfilippoi Ghidini, 1958
 Hydroporus sardomontanus Pederzani, Rocchi & Schizzerotto, 2004
 Hydroporus scalesianus Stephens, 1828
 Hydroporus sectus Scudder, 1900
 Hydroporus semenowi Jakovlev, 1897
 Hydroporus sibiricus J.Sahlberg, 1880
 Hydroporus signatus Mannerheim, 1853
 Hydroporus simplex Gordon, 1981
 Hydroporus sinuatipes Fall, 1923
 Hydroporus sivrikaya Fery & Köksal, 2009
 Hydroporus spangleri Gordon, 1981
 Hydroporus springeri J.Müller, 1924
 Hydroporus statzi Nilsson, 2001
 Hydroporus striola (Gyllenhal, 1826)
 Hydroporus subarcticus Lomnicki, 1894
 Hydroporus submuticus Thomson, 1874
 Hydroporus subpubescens LeConte, 1852
 Hydroporus tademus Leech, 1949
 Hydroporus talyschensis Bilyashiwski, 2004
 Hydroporus tartaricus LeConte, 1850
 Hydroporus tatianae Fery & Petrov, 2006
 Hydroporus tenebrosus LeConte, 1850
 Hydroporus teres Sharp, 1882
 Hydroporus tessellatus (Drapiez, 1819)
 Hydroporus theobaldi Nilsson, 2003
 Hydroporus thracicus Guéorguiev, 1966
 Hydroporus tibetanus Zaitzev, 1953
 Hydroporus tokui Satô, 1985
 Hydroporus toledoi Fery & Köksal, 2009
 Hydroporus transgrediens Gschwendtner, 1923
 Hydroporus transpunctatus Chandler, 1941
 Hydroporus tristis (Paykull, 1798)
 Hydroporus tuvaensis Pederzani, 2001
 Hydroporus uenoi Nakane, 1963
 Hydroporus umbrosus (Gyllenhal, 1808)
 Hydroporus vagepictus Fairmaire & Laboulbène, 1855
 Hydroporus vespertinus Fery & Hendrich, 1988
 Hydroporus yakutiae Nilsson, 1990
 Hydroporus zackii Larson & Roughley, 2000
 Hydroporus zimmermanni J.Müller, 1926

References

External links

Hydroporus at Fauna Europaea

Dytiscidae genera